Hergert is a surname. Notable people with the surname include:

Heinrich Hergert (1904–1949), German footballer
Joe Hergert (1936–2016), American college and professional football player
Magdalena Hergert (1878-1938), American pioneer missionary
Mickey Hergert (born 1941), American football player